Sandfish may refer to:

Fish
Trichodontidae, known as sandfishes, a family of perch-like fish:
 Pacific sandfish, the species Trichodon trichodon 
 Arctoscopus japonicus, known as sailfin sandfish or Japanese sandfish
 Gonorynchus, known as beaked sandfish, a family of long thin ray-finned fish 
Gonorynchus gonorynchus, known as sandfish
 Southern sandfish, a family Leptoscopidae of perch-like fish
 Belted sandfish, a species Serranus subligarius of fish
 Clanwilliam sandfish, a species Labeo seeberi of fish
 Awaous tajasica, known as sand fish, a species of goby fish

Other animals 
 Scincus scincus, known as sandfish, a species of skink (lizard)
 Holothuria scabra, known as sandfish, a species of sea cucumber
 Thelenota ananas, known as sandfish, another species of sea cucumber

Animal common name disambiguation pages